Breslauer SC was a German association football club from the city of Breslau, Lower Silesia (today Wroclaw, Poland). The club enjoyed its greatest successes in the late 1920s.



History
The team was established in 1908 and soon became part of the top flight regional Südostdeutscher Fußballverband (SOFV, en:Southeast German Football Association). SC first came to note when they finished second in 1925 and moved on to the national playoffs. They beat VfB Leipzig 2–1 in a round of 16 match before going out in the quarter-finals 1–4 to eventual German champions 1. FC Nürnberg.

Breslau claimed its first Südostdeutsche championship in 1926 by defeating Viktoria Forst 3–1 in the league final. The club advanced to the national quarter-finals where they were once more put out by the side that would claim the national crown when they were beaten 0–4 by SpVgg Fürth. A second Südostdeutsche championship two seasons later in 1928 was followed by an early exit from national level play after a 2–3 round of 16 loss to VfB Königsberg.

SC enjoyed its best run on the national stage in 1929. They avenged themselves on Königsberg (1–2) before beating Bayern Munich 4–3 to move on to a semi-final confrontation with SpVgg Fürth. For a third time the Breslauer side was put out of contention for the German title by the club that would eventually emerge as national champions when they lost to Fürth by a score of 1–6.

Breslau continued to field competitive sides into the early 1930s but made only one more national level appearance in 1932 that had the side go out early to Holstein Kiel (1–4). In 1933, the club merged with Vereinigte Breslauer Sportfreunde to form Breslauer SpVg 02 which went on to play in the newly established first division Gauliga Schlesien through to the end of the 1943–44 season.

Honours
 South Eastern German champions: 1926, 1928

Notes

References
 Das deutsche Fußball-Archiv historical German domestic league tables 

Football clubs in Germany
Defunct football clubs in Germany
Association football clubs established in 1908
Association football clubs disestablished in 1933
Defunct football clubs in former German territories
Football clubs in Wrocław
History of Wrocław
1908 establishments in Germany
1933 disestablishments in Germany